In statistics, a unit root test tests whether a time series variable is non-stationary and possesses a unit root. The null hypothesis is generally defined as the presence of a unit root and the alternative hypothesis is either stationarity, trend stationarity or explosive root depending on the test used.

General approach 
In general, the approach to unit root testing implicitly assumes that the time series to be tested   can be written as,

where, 
   is the deterministic component (trend, seasonal component, etc.) 
  is the stochastic component.  
  is the stationary error process. 
The task of the test is to determine whether the stochastic component contains a unit root or is stationary.

Main tests 

Other popular tests include:
 augmented Dickey–Fuller test
 this is valid in large samples.
 Phillips–Perron test
 KPSS test
 here the null hypothesis is trend stationarity rather than the presence of a unit root.
 ADF-GLS test
Unit root tests are closely linked to serial correlation tests. However, while all processes with a unit root will exhibit serial correlation, not all serially correlated time series will have a unit root. Popular serial correlation tests include:
 Breusch–Godfrey test
 Ljung–Box test
 Durbin–Watson test

Notes

References
 "2007 revision"

Time series statistical tests